Ficus trichopoda (swamp fig) is a protected tree in South Africa.

See also
List of Southern African indigenous trees

References

External links
 

trichopoda
Protected trees of South Africa